Doncaster may refer to:

Places 

Doncaster, a large city in South Yorkshire, United Kingdom
Metropolitan Borough of Doncaster, a district in South Yorkshire that encompasses the city
Doncaster Racecourse, a racecourse in the city
Doncaster railway station, a large station that serves the city of Doncaster
Doncaster Rovers F.C., a football club who compete in the English league system
Doncaster, Victoria, a suburb of Melbourne
Electoral district of Doncaster, a former electoral district in Victoria, Australia
Doncaster, Quebec, an Indian reserve in Canada
Doncaster, Maryland (disambiguation), multiple places in the U.S. state of Maryland

People 

Stuart Doncaster (1890–1955), English footballer

Other 

Doncaster (horse), an influential Thoroughbred racehorse

English-language surnames